The 2004 Caribbean Football Union Club Championship was an international club football competition held in the Caribbean to determine the region's qualifier to the CONCACAF Champions' Cup. The 2004 edition included eight teams from six football associations, contested on a two-legged basis. Even though two teams from Trinidad and Tobago contested the 2003 final, only one team was entered in the 2004 tournament, as compared to two from Jamaica. The inclusion of teams from Saint Martin and Montserrat and not from other Caribbean countries was never explained.

The first round included one of the great mismatches in international club history, as Harbour View FC of Jamaica slammed Ideal of Montserrat, 30–1 on aggregate. In an all-Jamaican final, Jomo Gordon scored in stoppage time of the second leg to give Harbour View FC a 3–2 aggregate win over Tivoli Gardens FC, thereby advancing to the 2005 CONCACAF Champions' Cup.

First round

Semi-finals

Final

Harbour View FC 2004 CFU champions, advance to 2005 CONCACAF Champions' Cup quarterfinals.

Top scorers

External links
RSSSF – 2004 CFU Club Championship

2004
1